James Phipps (20 April 1884 – 17 September 1977) was an Australian rules footballer who played with Essendon in the Victorian Football League (VFL).

Notes

External links 

1884 births
1977 deaths
Australian rules footballers from Melbourne
Essendon Football Club players
People from Fitzroy, Victoria